Catharina Eline Maria "Catalien" Neelissen (born 4 November 1961 in Haarlem, North Holland) is a former international rower from the Netherlands, who won the bronze medal in the Women's Eights at the 1984 Summer Olympics in Los Angeles, California. Her teammates were Marieke van Drogenbroek, Lynda Cornet, Greet Hellemans, Nicolette Hellemans, Harriet van Ettekoven, Martha Laurijsen, Anne Quist, and Wiljon Vaandrager.

References

External links
 
 
 

1961 births
Living people
Dutch female rowers
Olympic rowers of the Netherlands
Rowers at the 1984 Summer Olympics
Olympic bronze medalists for the Netherlands
Sportspeople from Haarlem
Olympic medalists in rowing
Medalists at the 1984 Summer Olympics
20th-century Dutch women
21st-century Dutch women